Low Catton is a village in the East Riding of Yorkshire, England.

Low Catton lies on the east bank of the River Derwent. Together with High Catton, 1 mile to the east, it forms the civil parish of Catton.

The church, dedicated to All Saints, was designated a Grade I listed building in 1967 and is now recorded in the National Heritage List for England, maintained by Historic England.

In 1823 Low Catton church was under the patronage of the Earl of Egremont. In the village existed a grammar school with schoolmaster. Population at the time was 177. Occupations included nine farmers, a joiner, a shoemaker, and a curate. There was a yeoman, and the steward to Lord Egremont at Catton Lodge.

References

Villages in the East Riding of Yorkshire